Collision Course is a 1989 action comedy film starring Jay Leno as a Detroit police officer and Pat Morita as a Japanese officer forced to work together to recover a Japanese turbocharger stolen by a thief played by  Chris Sarandon. It was directed by Lewis Teague and unreleased in the U.S. until 1992, when it debuted on home video.

The story plays upon the culture clash between Detroit - whose economy is largely built on automobile manufacturing - and Japan - whose trade policies and export of cars were blamed for Detroit job losses in the 1980s.

Plot
The film opens with Oshima (Danny Kamekona) attempting to sell a revolutionary turbo charger to an auto maker headed by Derek Jarryd (Dennis Holahan). However, the deal is being brokered by two goons, Scully (Tom Noonan) and Kosnic (Randall "Tex" Cobb). When Oshima backs out at the last second, explaining he has hidden the turbo charger, he is tortured and hung upside down, where he has a fatal heart attack, dying before he can disclose the location of the turbo charger. The manager at the junkyard stumbles upon what is going on, and is shot with a rocket gun by Scully, killing him. Detective Tony Costas (Jay Leno) is called in to investigate, but is removed by his captain when they realize the junkyard manager is a former partner of Costas. Despite being told to back off the case, Costas enlist the help of his new partner, Shortcut (Ernie Hudson). Arriving in America at this time is Fujitsuka  Natsuo  (Pat Morita), assigned by his boss, Kitao (Soon-Tek Oh). Soon,  Natsuo  and Costas begin their own investigation after Natsuo finally admits the real reason he is in America.  After Natsuo poses as a reporter asking Jarryd about the new Turbo Charger, Jarryd is escorted away by Scully, tasked with watching over Jarryd by a corrupt crime boss named Madras (Chris Sarandon). Jarryd had taken a loan from Madras, who now controls Jarryd in order to make sure he gets a solid return on his "investment".

After seeing Scully being rough with Jarryd, both Natsuo and Costas deem Scully as worth following. Thanks to police work by Shorty, they learn of Scully's address and Natsuo and Costas go to his home. They break in and find that Scully's home is an armed fortress. Scully arrives and notices Costas and Natsuo. After a quick phone call to Madras, it is determined both men are to be killed. As they are searching Scully's home, Natsuo notices Scully aiming a rocket launcher at his own home. Both men escape just before the house blows up. They engage Scully in a gun fight that ends when Natsuo, who had accidentally stolen a grenade from Scully's home, gives the grenade to Costas, who tosses it out of the train car in which the men are hiding. Scully, being told it was directions to the Turbo Charger's location wrapped around a rock, is killed when the grenade goes off.

An angered Costas confronts Madras, and he is suspended from the force and Natsuo is requested to return home, in disgrace. However, both Costas and Natsuo  outwit Dingman, (Al Waxman), who had been assigned to see that Natsuo got on his plane back to Japan. Both men continue their investigation which leads them to an auto shop where Oshima placed it in the car he had rented. After a brief gun battle with Kosnic and some goons, Costas and Natsuo make their way the rental company and locate Oshima's car. This time, they are chased by Madras and his goons, briefly interrupting an auto race taking place on Detroit's streets. After they crash the car, Costas and Natsuo steal a motorcycle, which they later crash as well. With his goons stripping the car, Madras drives off in pursuit. After locating Costas and Natsuo, he shoots Costas and attempts to run down Natsuo, who despite Costas' plea has begun to run towards the car. Natsuo delivers a kamikaze attack on Madras, kicking through the windshield and hitting Madras so hard the force of the strike decapitates him. With the car going out of control, Costas rolls out of the way. He recovers in time to rescue Natsuo from the hood of the car, which has now crashed, right before the car explodes.

The next scene takes place in an airport, with Natsuo going home to Japan, with Oshima's body but no turbo charger. However, Costas has arranged for a police woman to deliver the part to him so he could in turn, help his partner save face with his boss in Japan. The film ends with both newfound friends saying their good-byes.

Production

Much of the principal photography for the film was shot on location in Detroit, Michigan. Numerous local landmarks are shown in various scenes, including the now-defunct Trapper's Alley in the city's Greektown Historic District neighborhood and the Garden Bowl within the Majestic Theatre Centre—the United States' oldest continuously operating bowling alley.  Other parts of the movie were filmed in Wilmington, North Carolina.

When Morita guest-starred on The Tonight Show in 1989, with Leno serving as guest host, they recalled that the movie had run out of money on the last day of filming, with key scenes yet to be shot and no budget left for editing and post-production.

Cast
 Pat Morita as Inspector Fujitsuka Natsuo
 Jay Leno as Detective Tony Costas
 Chris Sarandon as Madras
 Tom Noonan as Scully
 Dennis Holahan as Derrick Jarryd
 Ernie Hudson as "Shortcut"
 John Hancock as Lieutenant Ryerson
 Al Waxman as Dingman
 Soon-Tek Oh as Chief Inspector Kitao
 Randall "Tex" Cobb as Kosnic
 Danny Kamekona as Oshima
 Angela Leslie as Girl At Photo Shop
 Ron Taylor as Autoworker #2
 Claudia Abel as Model At Auto Show

References

External links
 

1989 films
1989 action comedy films
1980s buddy comedy films
1980s crime comedy films
American action comedy films
American buddy comedy films
American buddy cop films
American crime comedy films
Interscope Communications films
Fictional portrayals of the Detroit Police Department
Films directed by Lewis Teague
Films scored by Ira Newborn
1980s buddy cop films
1980s police comedy films
1980s English-language films
Films shot in Michigan
Films shot in North Carolina
1980s American films